Between the Sheets is a 2003 British television miniseries. This dramedy depicts the romantic and sexual challenges of several different couples who are all linked in some way.

Hazel Delany walks out on her husband, owner of a stripclub, hours after their daughter's wedding; she's upset with him because he has had a string of affairs, and he is dismayed by her disinterest in sex (and exasperated that his mother has a better relationship with her boyfriend than he and his wife do). Hazel and Peter eventually go to a sex therapist to overcome their difficulties. Peter is hiding a secret about one of his ex-mistresses, and Hazel has a sexual awakening in the arms of a younger man.

Hazel and Peter's son, Simon, has left a long-term relationship. After the ex tells Hazel that she is pregnant, Hazel pushes him to reconcile with and marry his girlfriend, but he's reluctant to do so, because he has fallen for one of his father's nightclub hostesses.

Alona Cunningham works as a sex therapist yet finds her boyfriend, Paul, unenthusiastic in the bedroom. Paul works as a probation officer and reveals that he is being accused of having had sex with one of his 15-year-old clients. As Paul's alleged misconduct is being investigated, Alona catches her teenage son sleeping with the au pair, and through the stress of all this considers having an affair. The couple end up seeing one of Alona's colleagues for therapy.

Cast
Alun Armstrong as Peter Delany
Brenda Blethyn as Hazel Delany
Dean Andrews as Steve Ashby
James Thornton as Simon Delany
Gaynor Faye as Georgia Lovett
Liz Smith as Audrey Delany
Norman Wisdom as Maurice Hardy
Julie Graham as Alona Cunningham
Richard Armitage as Paul Andrews
Vinette Robinson as Tracy Ellis

Episodes

References

External links 
 

2003 British television series debuts
2003 British television series endings
2000s British comedy-drama television series
ITV television dramas
English-language television shows
2000s British romance television series
2000s British television miniseries